Raków  is a village in Kielce County, Świętokrzyskie Voivodeship, in south-central Poland. It is the seat of the gmina (administrative district) called Gmina Raków. The village has a population of 1,213.

The town coat of arms includes a crayfish and is derived from the Warnia coat of arms of Sienieński's Arian wife, Jadwiga Gnoińska. The Socinian Racovian Academy was founded in 1602 by Jakub Sienieński, Jan Sienieński's son. By the 1630s, the town had grown to 15,000 inhabitants, with businesses centering on the Academy.

As the Counter-Reformation in Poland gathered force, pressure began to be used against the Socinians. On April 19, 1638 an incident occurred in which some young students of the Academy destroyed or removed a cross, giving the royal court the pretext needed to ban Arian activities, including printing and the schools, and sentenced teachers to exile, many heading south to the Principality of Transylvania. Jesuit scholar Szymon Starowolski justified the closing of Protestant schools (in 1638 and 1640), and Protestant centers and printing presses (in 1638, the press at Raków), as the "duty of good pastors" and as a legitimate act of the King and the Republic. The  was demolished in 1640. In 1641 Jakub Zadzik, archbishop of Kraków, began construction of the magnificent  on the same site and settled Franciscan friars in Raków to reconvert the Polish Brethren. The friars left the town around 1649. The main Arian buildings were destroyed, and more destruction was brought by Cossacks and Hungarians in 1657. By 1700 the town had only 700 inhabitants left.

Initially, after the first partition of the Polish–Lithuanian Commonwealth, Raków was in the Austrian Partition , and later in the Russian Partition. In 1820, Raków had 926 inhabitants, in 1864 their number rose to 2007, a significant part being Jewish. In 1869, like many other Polish towns, Raków has lost its town status and town privileges.

People 
 Fausto Paolo Sozzini, Italian Arian
 Lelio Sozzini, uncle of the above
 Stanisław Lubieniecki, Socinian
 Piotr of Goniądz, Socinian
 Gregory Paul of Brzeziny, Socinian
 Marcin Czechowic, Socinian
 Jan Niemojewski, Socinian
 Mikołaj Sienicki, Socinian
 Andrzej Wiszowaty, Socinian

References

Villages in Kielce County